Carajasia is a monotypic genus of flowering plants in the family Rubiaceae. The genus contains only one species, viz. Carajasia cangae, which is found on the mountain summits of Serra dos Carajás (Pará, Brazil).

References

Monotypic Rubiaceae genera
Spermacoceae